Petite Saline  is a quartier of Saint Barthélemy in the Caribbean. It is located in the central part of the island.

Populated places in Saint Barthélemy
Quartiers of Saint Barthélemy